Kybernetes is a peer-reviewed scientific journal of information and knowledge management exploring the complex relationships between information systems and management theory and practice to determine how humans develop meaningful and satisfying roles in professional and organisational contexts. The journal was established in 1972 and is the official journal of the UNESCO recognized  World Organisation of Systems and Cybernetics (WOSC) and The Cybernetics Society. It is published by Emerald Group Publishing.

Abstracting and indexing
Zentralblatt MATH
Academic Search
BIOSIS Previews
DBLP
Inspec
Institute for Scientific Information

References

External links
Official Website at Emerald Group Publishing
Kybernetes at ResearchGate
Kybernetes at Saybrook University

Computer science journals
Cybernetics
Systems thinking
Emerald Group Publishing academic journals